Michael Kremer is a philosopher who is known for his work in logic, philosophy of language and early analytic philosophy. He has published work on Bertrand Russell, Gottlob Frege, Ludwig Wittgenstein, and Gilbert Ryle. He is currently the Mary R. Morton Professor of Philosophy at the University of Chicago.

References 

University of Chicago faculty
Living people
Year of birth missing (living people)
Place of birth missing (living people)
Philosophers from Illinois
20th-century American philosophers
21st-century American philosophers